Horbachevo-Mykhaylivka is an urban-type settlement in the Proletarskyi District of the Donetsk municipality, Donetsk Oblast (province) of eastern Ukraine. Since 2014, it has been under the control of the self-declared Donetsk People's Republic. Population:

References

Urban-type settlements in Donetsk Raion
Donetsk